Roberto Durão (born 30 June 1959) is a Portuguese épée fencer and modern pentathlete. He competed in the modern pentathlon at the 1984 Summer Olympics and in the fencing at the 1988 Summer Olympics.

References

External links
 

1959 births
Living people
Portuguese male épée fencers
Portuguese male modern pentathletes
Olympic fencers of Portugal
Olympic modern pentathletes of Portugal
Fencers at the 1988 Summer Olympics
Modern pentathletes at the 1984 Summer Olympics
Sportspeople from Lisbon
20th-century Portuguese people
21st-century Portuguese people